The coppery-chested jacamar (Galbula pastazae) is a species of bird in the family Galbulidae. It is found in Colombia, Ecuador and Peru.

Taxonomy and systematics

The coppery-chested jacamar is monotypic. It and the rufous-tailed (Galbula ruficauda), white-chinned (G. tombacea), bluish-fronted (G. cyanescens), and green-tailed jacamars (G. glabula) are considered to form a superspecies.

Description

The male's crown is metallic green with a blue gloss. The rest of the upper parts are metallic bronzy green. The throat and breast are shiny green and the belly and vent area are dark rufuous. The female is similar except that the chin and throat are dark rufous.

Distribution and habitat

The coppery-chested jacamar is effectively endemic to Ecuador, though there are records from a single site in each of far southern Colombia and far northern Peru. The coppery-chested jacamar inhabits humid montane forest. It is a bird of the understory, being found along forest edges, along watercourses, and at tree falls and landslides that provide openings.

Behavior

Feeding

The coppery-chested jacamar is insectivorous but few details of its diet or feeding methods are known.

Breeding

One known nest of the coppery-chested jacamar was a burrow in an earth bank. Little else has been documented about its breeding.

Vocalization

The coppery-chested jacamar's song is "a rising series of wee notes, sometimes ending in a descending rattle" . Its call is "a weet note, singly or in a series" .

Status

The IUCN has assessed the coppery-chested jacamar as least concern. It is uncommon and its population is believed to be decreasing in parallel with forest destruction.

References

External links
BirdLife Species Factsheet.

coppery-chested jacamar
Birds of the Ecuadorian Andes
coppery-chested jacamar
coppery-chested jacamar
Taxonomy articles created by Polbot